The following are the association football events of the year 1997 throughout the world.

Events
January 1 – Manager Leo Beenhakker is named technical director at Dutch club Vitesse Arnhem and replaced as a manager by Sparta Rotterdam head coach Henk ten Cate.
Roberto Carlos goal by famous 'banana shot' in free kick against France in 1997 Tournoi de France
Copa Libertadores 1997: is won by Cruzeiro after defeating Sporting Cristal on an aggregate score of 1–0.
UEFA Champions League: Borussia Dortmund won 3–1 in final against Juventusin the Olympiastadion. The goals for the Germans are scored by Riedle in the 29th and 34th minute and Ricken in the 71st minute.
Scottish Cup: Kilmarnock FC beats Falkirk 1–0.
February 25 – Manager Hans Westerhof is sacked by FC Groningen.
April 30 – Striker Boudewijn Zenden from PSV Eindhoven plays his first international match for the Netherlands national football team, when Holland defeats San Marino 6–0 in Serravalle.
May 17 – Chelsea wins the FA Cup by defeating Middlesbrough 2–0.
May 18 – Eric Cantona, the famous and controversial French footballer in the Premiership, announces his retirement from football.
June 29 – Brazil wins the 1997 Copa América by defeating home nation Bolivia 3–1 in the final in the Estadio Hernando Siles in La Paz.
July 20 – Gudjon Thordarson makes his debut as the manager of Iceland with a 1–0 loss against Norway.
August 17 – PSV Eindhoven wins the Johan Cruijff Schaal, the annual opening of the new season in the Eredivisie, with a 3–1 win over Roda JC in the Amsterdam ArenA.
November 2 – Borussia Dortmund wins the Intercontinental Cup in Tokyo, Japan by defeating Brazil's Cruzeiro 2–0. The goals for the Germans are scored by Michael Zorc and Heiko Herrlich.

Winner national club championships

Asia
 - Júbilo Iwata
 – Al-Ansar
 – Al-Arabi
 - Pusan Daewoo Royals
 - Bangkok Bank, Royal Thai Air Force

Europe
  – CSKA Sofia
  – Croatia Zagreb
  – Manchester United
  – AS Monaco
  – Bayern Munich
  – Olympiacos
  – Juventus
  – PSV Eindhoven
  – Rosenborg
  – Widzew Łódź
  – Porto
  – Real Madrid
  – Galatasaray
  – Partizan

North America

Verano – Chivas
Invierno – Cruz Azul
 – D.C. United (MLS)

South America

Clausura – River Plate
Apertura – River Plate
 – Bolívar
 – Vasco da Gama

Apertura – Universidad Católica
Clausura – Colo-Colo
 – Olimpia Asunción
 – Alianza Lima

International tournaments
 UNCAF Nations Cup in Guatemala City, Guatemala (April 16–27, 1997)
 
 
 
 Copa América in Bolivia (June 11–29, 1997)
 
 
 
 Baltic Cup in Vilnius, Lithuania (July 9 – 11 1997)
 
 
 
 FIFA U-20 World Cup in Malaysia (June 16 – July 5, 1997)
 
 
 
 FIFA U-17 World Championship in Egypt (September 5–21, 1997)
 
 
 
 Tournoi de France in France (June 3–11, 1997)

National team results

Europe



South America



Births
 January 1 – Quique Fornos, Spanish footballer
 January 5 – Jesús Vallejo, Spanish footballer
 January 7 – Izzy Brown, English footballer
 January 8 – Fran Brodić, Croatian footballer
 January 26 – Gedion Zelalem, American footballer
 January 31 – Arnaut Danjuma, Dutch footballer
 February 3 – Lewis Cook, English footballer
 February 10 – Adam Armstrong, English footballer
 February 26 – Malcom, Brazilian footballer
 March 3 
 Elia Alessandrini, Swiss footballer (d. 2022)
 Jaime Carreño, Chilean footballer
 March 6 – Daniel De Silva, Australian youth international
 March 12 
 Dean Henderson, English footballer
 Allan Saint-Maximin, French footballer
 March 29 – Ezequiel Ponce, Argentine footballer
 April 2 – Abdelhak Nouri, Dutch footballer
 April 5 – Borja Mayoral, Spanish footballer 
 April 13 – Mateo Cassierra, Colombian footballer
 April 17 – Jorge Meré, Spanish footballer
 April 27 – Josh Onomah, English footballer
 May 12 – Frenkie de Jong, Dutch footballer
 May 14 – Rúben Dias, Portuguese footballer
 May 17
 Andrea Favilli, Italian footballer
 Ayron Verkindere, Belgian footballer
 June 16 – Jean-Kévin Augustin, French footballer
 June 22 – Gabriel Rojas, Argentine footballer
 July 3 – Filip Sachpekidis, Swedish footballer
 July 11 – Rasmus Kristensen, Danish footballer
 July 25 – Louis Reed, English footballer
 August 2 – Ivan Šaponjić, Serbian footballer
 August 3 
 Daniel Crowley, English youth international
 Adrian Lillebekk Ovlien, Norwegian footballer (d. 2018)
 August 4 – Cinzia Zehnder, Swiss footballer
 August 6 – Sander Svendsen, Norwegian youth international
 August 9 – Leon Bailey, Jamaican international
 August 19 – Bartłomiej Drągowski, Polish footballer
 August 22 – Lautaro Martínez, Argentine footballer
 August 29 – Ainsley Maitland-Niles, English footballer
 September 15 – Jeisson Vargas, Chilean footballer
 September 16 – Zsanett Kaján, Hungarian women's international
 October 2 – Tammy Abraham, English international
 October 6 – Kasper Dolberg, Danish international
 October 17 – Václav Černý, Czech footballer
 November 1 – Nordi Mukiele, French footballer
 November 14 – Christopher Nkunku, French footballer
 November 18 – Olivier Boscagli, French footballer
 November 26 – Aaron Wan-Bissaka, English footballer
 December 7 – Abi Harrison, Scottish footballer
 December 11 – Konstantinos Mavropanos, Greek footballer

Deaths

January
 January 10 – Francisco Aramburu, Brazilian striker, runner-up at the 1950 FIFA World Cup. (75)

February
 February 19 – Afonso Guimarães da Silva, Brazilian midfielder, semi-finalist at the 1938 FIFA World Cup. (82)
 February 21 – Josef Posipal, West-German defender, winner of the 1954 FIFA World Cup. (69, heart failure)

March
 March 25 – Baltazar, Brazilian striker, runner-up at the 1950 FIFA World Cup. (71)

April
April 23 – Brian Alderson (46), Scottish footballer

June
June 4 – Pedro Zaballa (58), Spanish footballer
June 18 – Héctor Yazalde (51), Argentinian footballer

July
July 8 – Dick van Dijk (51), Dutch footballer
July 10 – Ivor Allchurch (67), Welsh footballer

September
 September 21 – Juan Burgueño, Uruguayan forward, winner of the 1950 FIFA World Cup. (91)
 September 29 – Dequinha, Brazilian midfielder, Brazilian squad member at the 1954 FIFA World Cup. (69)

October
 October 18 – Ramiro Castillo (31), Bolivian footballer
 October 31 – Bram Appel (76), Dutch footballer
 October 31 – Hans Bauer, West-German defender, winner of the 1954 FIFA World Cup. (70)

November
November 1 – Roger Marche (73), French footballer
November 9 – Helenio Herrera (80), Argentine-French footballer and manager

December
 December 7 – Billy Bremner (54), Scottish footballer
 December 28 – William Martínez, Uruguayan midfielder, winner of the 1950 FIFA World Cup. (69)

References

 
Association football by year